Arthur Guilherme de Sousa Fortunato (born 16 May 1994) is a Brazilian futsal player who plays for Portuguese club Benfica and the Brazilian national futsal team as a winger.

References

External links
Liga Nacional de Futsal profile
Liga Nacional Fútbol Sala profile

1994 births
Living people
Futsal forwards
Brazilian men's futsal players
S.L. Benfica futsal players